Micropostega is a genus of moths in the family Lyonetiidae.

Selected species
Micropostega aeneofasciata Walsingham, 1891

External links
Butterflies and Moths of the World Generic Names and their Type-species

Lyonetiidae
Moth genera